Maria Szkeli (born 25 August 1941) is a Romanian sprint canoer who competed in the early 1960s. She finished sixth in the K-2 500 m event at the 1960 Summer Olympics in Rome.

References
Sports-reference.com profile

External links

1941 births
Canoeists at the 1960 Summer Olympics
Living people
Olympic canoeists of Romania
Romanian female canoeists
Place of birth missing (living people)